Alpha-Bits, also known as Frosted Alpha-Bits, was a brand of breakfast cereal made by Post Consumer Brands, which contained frosted alphabet-shaped multi-grain (whole-grain oat and corn flour) cereal bits. Post Cereals also started producing "Marshmallow Alpha-Bits" in 1990.

Alpha-Bits cereal was invented by Thomas M. Quigley who worked for Post Cereals. The cereal was introduced in 1957 and was taken off the market in 2006. However, Alpha-Bits reappeared for sale in January 2008 with a new formulation, touting "0% Sugar!" as a "Limited Edition" cereal.  The old recipe was reintroduced later in 2008. The cereal was substantially reformulated in 2017, with the "new and improved" Alpha-Bits having larger shapes than its predecessor. Alpha-Bits was discontinued in May 2021.

Varieties
"Marshmallow Alpha-Bits", introduced in 1990, contained frosted alphabet-shaped corn cereal bits and marshmallows.  This variation of the original Alpha-Bits cereal contained marshmallow vowels: pink A's, yellow E's, purple I's, orange O's, green U's, and, later, blue Y's.  Over time, the marshmallows underwent changes such as super-swirls and splits in their colors. Beginning in 2004, Marshmallow Alpha-Bits began disappearing from various markets, before finally being discontinued altogether in 2011.

Marshmallow Alpha-Bits were invented by a small-time entrepreneur named Andrew R. Miller and his cousin Andrew W. Peterson, the latter of whom was a chef at a local restaurant in upstate New York. The pair sold the idea to Post in 1989. 

In August 2005, Post Cereals introduced sugar-free Alpha-Bits cereal. In some regions, such as the southeast, Marshmallow Alpha-Bits were removed from shelves by 2000.

Mascots
One of the first  advertisers of the cereal was the Ruff and Reddy cartoon show in 1957. Alvin and the Chipmunks were also early pitchers for Alpha-Bits, as Post's then-parent General Foods was the sponsor of The Alvin Show for its sole season beginning in 1961.

Beginning in 1964, the mascot for Alpha-Bits was a postman, possibly a pun on "Post Man" named "Loveable Truly", who was originally voiced by insult comic Jack E. Leonard in a Southern accent. Loveable Truly was also a character in the 1960s cartoon show Linus the Lionhearted on CBS, along with other Post Cereals mascots at the time (including Sugar Bear of Golden Crisp, then called Sugar Crisp).

Since then, mascots have included the "Alpha-Bits Wizard", who appeared near children in kitchens. In Canada, the last Alpha-Bits mascot was "Alpha", a computer who "makes bits". As of 2014, he has been discontinued. The Canadian "Alpha" at first resembled IBM PCs, but recent versions resemble a 2006 iMac.

In the 1980s there was yet another mascot named "Alfie the Alpha-Bits Cereal Wonder Dog". Michael Jackson and The Jackson 5 starred in a series of Alpha-Bits musical TV commercials in 1973. In the 1990s the mascots are the anthropomorphic cereal bits.

Post Alpha-Bits cereal was also a sponsor of Arthur on PBS. The TV show Super Why! currently mascots and endorses this cereal.

Taglines 
...Tastiest cereal you've ever met—it's just like eating up the alphabet!
(Alpha-Bits spell energy from A to Z with a capital E. And O G, they simply happen to be a little bit better!) They're A-B-C-Delicious!
Think smart. Think Alpha-Bits cereal. (Canada only)
Alpha-Bits, you know you want them, come and have some!
They're ice-cream-a-licious!
They're A, B, C, D-licious

Appearances in the media 
In a sponsor spot for the TV sitcom The Andy Griffith Show, Andy advertises Post Alpha-Bits through a swearing-in of deputy Barney Fife before saying his famous trademark line "I appreciate it and goodnight."
An episode of Family Guy features a cutaway gag in which Peter and Brian are sitting at the kitchen table; Peter is eating a bowl of breakfast cereal and suddenly tells Brian that there's a message in his Alpha-Bits which simply says "Ooooo". A visibly annoyed Brian looks up from his newspaper and points out that they are actually Cheerios.
 In an episode of The Simpsons called "Co-Dependents' Day", there was a scene where Cosmic Wars creator Randall Curtis gives Bart and Lisa a "Jim-Jam" cereal, saying that "It's just Alpha-Bits with extra Js".
This cereal can be seen in the 2003 movie Anger Management.
In the All Grown Up! episode "Interview With a Campfire", Tommy says "Coming from the man who communicates with aliens through the Alpha-Bits cereal" .
In the Eric's Depression episode of That '70s Show, Eric is eating Alpha-Bits and as he takes the first bite, he notices the letters spell out "DONNA". 
In season 2 episode 24, of That '70s Show, the words "Post Alpha Bits" appears stamped on the side of a box that Eric is moving in the office of Price Mart with Red looking on.  
This cereal appears in Diary of a Wimpy Kid where Greg rushed to breakfast in the beginning. He is seen pouring milk and Alpha Bits into his mouth.
This cereal is seen in Pretty Little Liars when Emily pours it in her bowl to discover it's all As, referencing series antagonist "A".
In season 2 of Everybody Loves Raymond, Frank says to Raymond "I could have eaten a box of Alpha-bits and crapped a better interview."
In 2000, a Marshmallow Alpha-Bits commercial featured the main characters from The Land Before Time film series.

See also
Alphabet pasta
List of breakfast cereals

References

External links
 

Post cereals
Products introduced in 1958
Products and services discontinued in 2021